Ji-hyun, also spelled Ji-hyeon, or Jee-hyun, is Korean unisex given name. The meaning differs based on the hanja used to write each syllable of the name. There are 61 hanja with the reading "ji" and 42 hanja with the reading "hyun" on the South Korean government's official list of hanja which may be used in given names. Ji-hyun was the ninth-most popular name for baby girls in South Korea in 1990.

People
People with this name include:

Actors and actresses
Jung Ji-hyun (born 1970), stage name Jung Jae-young, South Korean actor 
Jun Ji-hyun (born 1981), South Korean actress and model
Kim Ji-hyun (born 1982), stage name Lee El, South Korean actress
Min Ji-hyun (born 1984), South Korean actress
Ahn Ji-hyun (born 1992), South Korean actress
Nam Ji-hyun (born 1995), South Korean actress
Han Ji-hyun (born 1996), South Korean actress

Singers
Kim Ji-hyun (singer) (born 1972), South Korean female singer, member of Roo'ra
Lee Ji-hyun (actress) (born 1983), South Korean female singer, former member of Jewelry
Lee Ji-hyun (born 1986), stage name Qri, South Korean female singer and actress, member of T-ara
Kim Ji-hyun (born 1988), stage name G.Soul, American male singer of Korean descent
Son Ji-hyun (born 1990), South Korean singer and actress, former member of 4Minute
Kang Ji-hyun (born 1992), stage name Soyou, South Korean singer and actress, member of Sistar

Sportspeople
Song Ji-hyun (born 1969), South Korean female team handball player
Kim Ji-hyun (badminton) (born 1974), South Korean female badminton player
Lee Ji-hyun (swimmer, born 1978), South Korean female swimmer who specialised in the backstroke
Lee Ji-hyun (swimmer, born 1982), South Korean female swimmer who specialised in individual medley events
Jung Ji-hyun (born 1983), South Korean male wrestler
Kim Ji-heun (born 1989), South Korean male swimmer
Sung Ji-hyun (born 1991), South Korean female badminton player
Choi Ji-hyun (born 1994), South Korean female short track speed skater
Kim Ji-hyon (born 1995), South Korean male freestyle skier
Byun Ji-hyun (born 1999), South Korean female figure skater

Other
Jee Hyun Kim, Australian female neuroscientist
Baek Ji-hyun (born 1993), South Korean female model

Fictional characters
Fictional characters with this name include:
Kim Ji-hyun, in 2008 South Korean television series East of Eden
Kim Jihyun, in 2016 South Korean otome visual novel game Mystic Messenger

See also
List of Korean given names

References

Korean unisex given names